Teodoro Galan Baldomaro (January 1, 1948 – October 22, 2017), professionally known as  Baldo Marro, was an actor, screenwriter, stunt director, film director and producer in the Philippines. He was awarded Best Actor by the prestigious Metro Manila Film Festival in 1988 for the action film Patrolman.

Career

He started as stuntman before he became an action star. In 1988 Metro Manila Film Festival, Marro won Best Actor for Patrolman, which also won him the Best Director award. Marro starred in Boy Negro (1988), Iyo ang Batas, Akin ang Katarungan (1988), Tumakbo Ka Hanggang May Lupa (1990), and Alyas Boy Tigas: Ang Probinsiyanong Wais (1998).

He directed Lito Lapid in the movies for Regal Films such as Huwag Mong Ubusin ang Bait Ko (2000), and Bukas, Babaha ng Dugo (2001), among others. He appeared in Joel Lamangan's Mamarazzi (2010).

Death
Marro died at the age of 69 on October 22, 2017. 
He was buried at Angelus Memorial Park in Bacoor, Cavite.

Awards and nominations

Selected filmography

Film

As film director
Ibigay Mo ng Todong-Todo (1995) - Universal Motion Dancers
Pintado (1999) - Monsour del Rosario
Bayolente (1999) - Zoren Legaspi
Makamandag Na Bala (2000) - Jestoni Alarcon
Baliktaran (2000) - Zoren Legaspi
Pasasabugin Ko ang Mundo Mo (2000) - Lito Lapid
Akin ang Labang Ito (2000) - Ace Espinosa
Huwag Mong Ubusin ang Bait Ko! (2000) - Lito Lapid
Duwag Lang ang Sumusuko (2001) - Gary Estrada
Masikip Na ang Mundo Mo, Labrador (2001) - Lito Lapid
Bukas, Babaha ng Dugo (2001) - Lito Lapid
Parola - Bilangguang Walang Rehas (2002) - Ace Espinosa
Ligaya ... Katumbas ng Buhay (2003) - Brando Legaspi
Makamundo (2004) - Joko Diaz

As stuntman
Makahiya at Talahib (1976) (fight instructor) 
Teritoryo Ko Ito (1979) (routine instructor) 
Ang Leon, ang Tigre, at ang Alamid (1979) (fight instructor) 
Holdup (Special Squad, D.B.) (1979) (stunt coordinator)
Kodengo Penal: The Valderama Case (1980) (fight instructor) 
Tatak Angustia (1980) (fight instructor) 
Kamandag ng Rehas Na Bakal (1981) (routine instructor) / (stunts) 
Pepeng Shotgun (1981) (routine instructor) 
Vendetta (1982) (routine instructor)
Kunin Mo ang Ulo ni Magtanggol (1984) (routine instructor) 
Somewhere (1984) (fight instructor)
Baun Gang (1985) (fight instructor)
Isusumpa Mo ang Araw nang Isilang Ka (1986) (stunt director)
Agaw Armas (1986) (stunt director)
Gabi na Kumander (1986) (fight director)
Anak ng Lupa (1987) (fight director)
Balweg, the Rebel Priest (1987) (action sequences) 
Boy Tornado (1987) (fight director) 
Afuang Bounty Hunter (1988) (action director)
Boy Negro (1988) (fight director)
Alega Gang: Public Enemy No.1 of Cebu (1988)
Joe Pring Homicide Manila Police (1989) (stunt director)
Target... Police General: Major General Alfredo Lim Story (1989) (fight and stunt instructor) 
Urbanito Dizon: The Most Notorious Gangster in Luzon (1990) (stunt and routine director) 
Bala at Rosaryo (1990) (stunt director) 
Beautiful Girl (1990) (stunt director)
Hukom .45 (1990) (action sequence director) 
APO: Kingpin ng Maynila (1990) (action director) 
Alyas Pogi: Birador ng Nueva Ecija (1990) (stunt director)
Leon ng Maynila, Lt. Col. Romeo Maganto (1991) (stunt director) 
Kapitan Jaylo: Batas sa Batas (1991) (fight director)
Alyas Pogi 2 (1991) (fight director) 
Pangako Sa'yo (1992) (fight and stunt director)
Manong Gang (1992) (stunt director) 
Magnong Rehas (1992) (stunt director)
Alyas Boy Kano (1992) (stunt & fight director)
Alyas Hunyango (1992) (fight director)
Narito ang Puso Ko (1992) (stunt director) 
Hanggang May Buhay (1992) (stunt director)
Pacifico Guevarra: Dillinger (1992) (fights and stunts director) 
Boy Pita: Teritoryo ng Caloocan (1993) (stunts & fight director)
Ikaw Lang (1993) (fight instructor) 
Dodong Armado (1993) (stunt director) 
Paranaque Bank Robbery (1993) (fight director)
Lt. Madarang: Iginuhit sa Dugo (1993) (stunt director) 
Nandito Ako (1993) (stunt director)
Ismael Zacarias (1994) (fight director)
Iukit Mo sa Bala! (1994) (fight director)
Costales (1995) (fight and stunt director)
Ibigay Mo ng Todong-todo (1995) (stunt director)
Batas Ko Ay Bala (1996) (stunts and fight director)
Moises Arcanghel: Sa Guhit ng Bala (1996) (action director)
Laban Ko Ito: Walang Dapat Madamay (1997) (fight director)
Strebel: Gestapo ng Maynila (1998) (fight director)
Walang Katumbas ang Dugo (1998) (fight director)
Pintado (1999) (fight instructor) 
Kapag Kumukulo ang Dugo! (1999) (fight director)
Walang Iwanan PEKSMAN! (2002) (fight director)
You & Me: Against the World (2003) (action director)
Utang ng Ama (2003) (fight instructor)   
Resiklo (2007) (fight director) 
And I Love You So (2009) (stunt director)
I Love You Goodbye (2009) (stunt director)
Ang Panday (2009) (stunts)  
Ang Darling Kong Aswang (2009) (stunt and fight director) 
Here Comes the Bride (2010) (stunt director) / (stunts) 
Si Agimat at si Enteng Kabisote (2010) (fight director) 
Bulong (2011) (fight director) 
No Other Woman (2011) (stunt director) 
Ang Panday 2 (2011) (fight/stunt director) 
Born to Love You (2012) (stunt director)
The Trial (2014) (stunt director) 
Past Tense (2014) (stunt director) 
Muslim Magnum .357: To Serve and Protect (2014) (fight director)
The Amazing Praybeyt Benjamin (2014) (fight director)
Crazy Beautiful You (2015) (stunt director) 
Para sa Hopeless Romantic (2015) (stunt director)
How to Be Yours (2016) (stunt director)

See also
Dante Varona
Dan Alvaro

References

"A look at the past MMFF controversies".
http://www.spot.ph/entertainment/51060/top-10-out-of-action-pinoy-action-stars

1947 births
2017 deaths
Filipino film producers
Filipino male film actors
Filipino screenwriters
Place of birth missing
Filipino film directors
Actors from Cavite